Heidi Suomi (born 2 January 1975) is a Finnish sprinter. She competed in the women's 4 × 100 metres relay at the 1996 Summer Olympics.

References

1975 births
Living people
Athletes (track and field) at the 1996 Summer Olympics
Finnish female sprinters
Olympic athletes of Finland
Place of birth missing (living people)
Olympic female sprinters